Gabriel Tual (born 9 April 1998) is a French middle-distance runner specialising in the 800 metres. His personal best time is 1:44.28, which he ran in Tokyo Japan on 1 August 2021, which qualified him to compete in the 800 metres at the 2020 Summer Olympics, where he made it to the finals.

Personal bests
Outdoor
800 metres – 1:44.28 (Tokyo 2021)
1500 metres – 3:52.12 (Lormont 2019)
Indoor
800 metres – 1:47.54 (Miramas 2021)
1500 metres – 3:56.23 (Bordeaux 2018)

References

1998 births
Living people
French male middle-distance runners
Athletes (track and field) at the 2020 Summer Olympics
Olympic athletes of France